José Benito Ortega (La Cueva, 1858–1941, Raton) was an American sculptor, principally a santero.

He was born and died in New Mexico.

References

1858 births
1941 deaths
19th-century American sculptors
19th-century American male artists
American male sculptors
20th-century American sculptors
20th-century American male artists